Mike Caruso (born September 14, 1958) is a Republican member of the Florida Legislature representing the state's 89th House district, which includes part of Palm Beach County.

History
A native of Washington, D.C., Caruso moved to Florida in 1986.

Florida House of Representatives
Caruso defeated Matt Spritz in the August 28, 2018 Republican primary, winning 56.2% of the vote.

In the November 6, 2018 general election, Caruso was narrowly elected with 50.02% of the vote, defeating Democrat Jim Bonfiglio. Caruso's margin of victory — just 32 votes — triggered both a machine and manual recount under Florida law.

References

|-

Republican Party members of the Florida House of Representatives
Living people
21st-century American politicians
George Washington University alumni
1958 births